Lemyra anormala is a moth of the family Erebidae. It was described by Franz Daniel in 1943. It is found in China (Sichuan, Hubei, Yunnan, Zhejiang, Hunan, Fujian, Jiangxi, Shaanxi, Guizhou, Tibet), Burma and Vietnam.

Subspecies
Lemyra anormala anormala (Burma, Vietnam, China: Yunnan, Sichuan, Guizhou, Tibet)
Lemyra anormala danieli Thomas, 1990 (China: Zhejiang, Hunan, Fujian, Jiangxi, Hubei, Shaanxi)

References

 

anormala
Moths described in 1943